is a railway station in Nishiyodogawa-ku, Osaka Prefecture, Japan.

Lines
Hanshin Electric Railway
Main Line

Layout

Adjacent stations

Railway stations in Japan opened in 1921
Railway stations in Osaka Prefecture